"A Nightmare on My Street" is the third single from DJ Jazzy Jeff & The Fresh Prince's second studio album, He's the DJ, I'm the Rapper. The song became a crossover hit in the US, reaching #15 on the Hot 100. The song was released as a single in early 1988. The single was released on vinyl and audio cassette tape. The song humorously describes an encounter with the horror film villain Freddy Krueger and was considered for inclusion in the movie A Nightmare on Elm Street 4: The Dream Master, but the producers of the film decided against its inclusion.

New Line Cinema, copyright holders of the A Nightmare on Elm Street film franchise, sued DJ Jazzy Jeff & The Fresh Prince's record label for copyright infringement, forcing the label to destroy a music video produced for the song (though a copy of the video did survive and is available online). Both sides eventually settled out of court, but as a result, vinyl pressings of the album He's the DJ, I'm the Rapper contain a disclaimer sticker that says, "[This song] is not part of the soundtrack...and is not authorized, licensed, or affiliated with the Nightmare on Elm Street films." The song samples Charles Bernstein's musical motif from A Nightmare on Elm Street.

Content 
Will Smith starts the song off by telling a story about Freddy Krueger, whom he addresses as "Fred" and describes closely resembling the film character but without using his full name. Smith begins to recall his encounter with him. The story starts off on a Saturday evening when Smith, Jazzy Jeff, and Ready Rock C go on a triple date with three girls where they catch a movie. After Smith gets home he lies down for the night and supposedly wakes up sometime after 12:30 from the unusually hot temperature from the heater which has melted his alarm clock. He goes downstairs for something to drink, and as he gets downstairs he notices the TV still on which he finds strange, as he is home alone. He turns off the television, then he hears a voice from behind him, and without looking to see who it is, he runs out of the house. He gets half a block before he stops and comes to the realization that what he's experiencing is nothing more than a dream. So he returns home where Freddy grabs him and offers a homicidal team-up in which he can possess Will's body, a reference to the plot of A Nightmare on Elm Street 2: Freddy's Revenge. But Will turns down the offer and Freddy slashes Smith's chest. Smith, fearful for his life, runs up to his room and hides in his bed under his sheets. Freddy then hops on the bed on top of Smith and starts slashing away with Smith trying to fight back. But everything stops with the sound of Smith's alarm clock. Smith looks to see that no one is there and scoffs at what had happened, assuming it was all just a bad nightmare. But when he sees rips on his sheets he realizes what has happened and quickly calls Jeff to warn him. As the song ends, Smith warns Jeff to stay awake, and Jeff suddenly starts screaming with Freddy laughing in the phone's background telling Smith, "I'm your DJ now, Princey!"

Versions 

The original track as included on the original LP and cassette pressings of the album He's the DJ, I'm the Rapper ran 6:09. However, the entire album could not fit onto compact discs of the time, so for the CD release, many tracks were shortened; the single version "A Nightmare on My Street" was used in place of the original. This version is not simply an edit of the original album cut, as it included different lyrics in certain sections. The version included on DJ Jazzy Jeff & the Fresh Prince's Greatest Hits album is not the original single version. Although it is labeled "Single Edit" and runs the same length, it is simply an edited version of the original recording and does not include the different lyrics recorded for the single.

Track listing 
 7" Vinyl
 "A Nightmare on My Street" - 4:53
 "A Nightmare on My Street" (Instrumental) - 5:14

 12" Vinyl
 "A Nightmare on My Street" - 4:53
 "A Nightmare on My Street" (Instrumental) - 5:14

 12" Promotional Vinyl
 "A Nightmare on My Street" (Original Version) - 6:09
 "A Nightmare on My Street" (Single Version) - 4:53
 "A Nightmare on My Street" (Instrumental) - 6:08

Official versions 
 Original Version - 6:09 (Found on the 12" Vinyl)
 Instrumental - 6:08 (Found on the 7" Vinyl)
 Single Version - 4:16 (Found on the 12" Promotional Vinyl)

Charts

References 

1988 singles
DJ Jazzy Jeff & The Fresh Prince songs
Songs written by Will Smith
Songs written by DJ Jazzy Jeff
Horrorcore songs
Songs about nightmares
Songs about Freddy Krueger
A Nightmare on Elm Street (franchise) music
1988 songs
Jive Records singles